The Michigan Youth Arts Festival (MYAF) was an annual festival in Michigan where over 900 students from grades 9-12 participate in showcases, concerts and workshops in any of the represented disciplines: Creative Writing, Dance, Film, Vocal music, Instrumental Music, visual art and theatre.

History 
The Michigan Youth Arts Festival was founded in 1963 as a talent screening of young musicians organized by Dr. Joseph E. Maddy, founder of the Interlochen Center for the Arts.

MYAF Today 
Today MYAF is the culmination of several separate adjudication processes that selects approximately 900 students from over 60,000 students that apply. It has been held at Western Michigan University since 1985.

External links
Michigan Youth Arts Festival Homepage
Straus to Open Michigan Youth Arts Fest as 2006 Honorary Chairperson
Detroit News: 'Hoop Dreams' director offers insights at arts festival
National Endowment for the Arts: 2004 Grant Awards: State Listings: Michigan Youth Arts Festival

Music festivals in Michigan
Music competitions in the United States